Coleophora feoleuca is a moth of the family Coleophoridae. It is found in Spain.

The larvae feed on Salsola species and Suaeda altissima. They create a light to dark brown composite leaf case, made of two or three elements. The case is slender and 11–14 mm long. The mouth angle is about 45°.

References

feoleuca
Moths described in 1989
Moths of Europe